The Pokemouche River is in north eastern New Brunswick, Canada. The name is derived from the Algonquin language. Its headwaters are near the community of Paquetville, and it flows in an easterly direction approximately twenty kilometers where it empties into the Gulf of St. Lawrence at Inkerman Lake. Other communities along its watershed include Maltampec and Pokemouche. Its tributaries include South Branch Pokemouche River, Cowans Creek, and the Waugh River.

See also
List of rivers of New Brunswick

Rivers of New Brunswick